Pellaphalia Creek is a stream in the U.S. state of Mississippi. It is a tributary to the Pearl River.

Etymology
Pellaphalia is speculated to derive from the Choctaw words apeli meaning hurricane or strong winds and chalih meaning "chop down trees" in the Choctaw language. The name is purported to mean "(long) place where a hurricane or whirlwind passed along and blew down the timber".

References

Rivers of Mississippi
Rivers of Leake County, Mississippi
Tributaries of the Pearl River (Mississippi–Louisiana)
Mississippi placenames of Native American origin